The 1970 Florida gubernatorial election took place on November 3, 1970, to determine the Governor and Lieutenant Governor of Florida, concurrent with the election to the United States Senate, elections to the United States House of Representatives, and various state and local elections.

Incumbent Republican Governor Claude R. Kirk Jr. chose to run for a second term, with this being the first election in which the incumbent would be eligible for another four-year term. The first Republican elected governor since the Reconstruction Era, Kirk was challenged by Eckerd Corporation founder Jack Eckerd and State Senator Louis A. "Skip" Bafalis for his party's nomination. After failing to receive a majority, Kirk prevailed over Eckerd in a runoff. The primary for the Democratic Party nomination featured a four candidate field, with Florida Attorney General Earl Faircloth and President pro tempore of the Florida Senate Reubin Askew advancing to a runoff. Askew won the runoff and received the nomination of the Democratic Party.

This was the first election since the re-establishment of the office of Lieutenant Governor. Askew selected Florida Secretary of State Thomas Burton Adams Jr., while Kirk chose to run with incumbent Ray C. Osborne. Primarily due to controversial statements and actions during his term, as well as his inability to portray Askew as an extreme liberal as he had done with Robert King High in 1966, Kirk lost re-election to Askew in the general election by a margin of 56.88% to 43.12%.

Overview
Incumbent Governor of Florida Claude R. Kirk Jr. was the first Republican who held Florida's governorship since Reconstruction. He was elected in 1966, when Republicans has made some gains in traditionally Democratic Deep South. During his tenure as governor, the Florida Legislature created a new Constitution in 1968, which was approved by voters on November 5, 1968. As part of the new Constitution, the office of Lieutenant Governor was re-established. Kirk appointed Ray C. Osborne, a Florida House of Representatives member from Pinellas County. The new Constitution also allowed for the Governor of Florida to serve two consecutive terms. Kirk was thus eligible for re-election in 1970.

Republican primary
During the Republican primary, incumbent Claude Kirk was challenged by State Senator Louis A. Bafalis from Palm Beach and Eckerd founder Jack Eckerd of Clearwater. The Miami Herald endorsed Eckerd, stating that he is "an efficient campaigner with the ability to bring people together constructively. ... [Eckerd has] a common touch, dedication to high principle, and organizing genius." William C. Cramer, a powerful Republican in the state and the party's senate nominee for that year, publicly remained neutral during the primary, but voted for Eckerd. Later, Eckerd himself would state, "I was offended by his [Kirk's] public behavior and chagrined that he was a Republican."

In the primary election held on September 8, Kirk reached first place with 48.16% of the vote, compared to 38.37% for Eckerd, and 13.48% for Bafalis. However, because Kirk failed to receive a majority of the votes, he and Eckerd advanced to a run-offrelection.

Run-off
In the run-off election on September 29, Kirk received 199,943 votes versus Eckerd's 152,327 votes, by 47,616 votes – a margin of approximately 13.52%.

Democratic primary
Candidates
 President pro tempore of the Florida Senate Reubin Askew
 Earl Faircloth, Florida Attorney General
 Chuck Hall,  Mayor of Miami Dade County
 John E. Mathews, State Representative

In primaries, held on September 8, none of these candidates was able to win majority. As a result, the top two finishers, Faircloth and Askew, advanced to a runoff election.

Run-off
Although the primary election was a close race, Askew defeated Faircloth by a relatively wide margin in the run-off election on September 29. Askew earned 447,025 votes against Faircloth's 328,038 votes, by 312,158 votes – a margin of approximately 15.36%. Askew selected Florida Secretary of State Thomas Burton Adams Jr. to be his running mate.

General election
In response to the schism between Cramer and Kirk, the Miami Herald endorsed Askew and noted that "Askew and Chiles form a logical team; Kirk and Cramer don’t". Kirk mocked Askew as a "momma’s boy who wouldn’t have the courage to stand up under the fire of the legislators" and as a "nice, sweet-looking fellow chosen by ‘liberals’ ... to front for them." Despite promising no new taxes and several attempts to label Askew a "liberal", Kirk had overseen what was then the largest tax increase in Florida history.

Askew and Adams defeated incumbents Governor Kirk and Lieutenant Governor Ray C. Osborn with respectable margin.

On the very same day Florida elected to the United States Senate Democrat Lawton Chiles, who later was elected Governor in 1990.

References

Florida
Gubernatorial
1970
November 1970 events in the United States